Acoustic is the third extended play by Christian pop recording artist Britt Nicole. It includes five acoustic versions of previous songs and a brand new song entitled "Found By You", co-written by Brandon Heath. It debuted at No. 22 on Billboard's Hot Christian Albums chart, which is her second highest entry to date.

Reception

Track listing

Charts
Album

References

2010 EPs
Britt Nicole albums
EPs by American artists